Reticular erythematous mucinosis (REM) is a skin condition caused by fibroblasts producing abnormally large amounts of mucopolysaccharides. It is a disease that tends to affect women in the third and fourth decades of life.

See also 
 Mucinosis
 List of cutaneous conditions

References

External links 

Mucinoses